"Say Something" is a song by Australian recording artist Kylie Minogue, taken from her fifteenth studio album Disco (2020). It was released as the album's lead single on 23 July 2020, by BMG Rights Management and Minogue's company, Darenote. Minogue co-wrote the song with Ash Howes and its producers Jonathan Green and Richard Stannard. Say Something is a disco song with synths, drum crashes, a funk guitar, and a choir. Its lyrical content addresses themes of seeking love and calling for unity.

"Say Something" received widespread praise from music critics for its production values and sound. Some critics regarded it as one of the album's highlights and among Minogue's best work. Commercially, it peaked at number 56 on the UK Singles Chart and was in the top 20 on Minogue's native Australia, provided by Radiomonitor and Billboard respectively. Elsewhere, "Say Something" charted in Belgium, Hungary, New Zealand, and Scotland, as well as on component charts in the United States. Additionally, the song was certified gold by Pro-Música Brasil for sales over 20,000 in Brazil.

Long-time collaborator Sophie Muller directed the accompanying music video for "Say Something," which was shot in London, England. It depicts Minogue travelling through space on a golden horse sculpture while adhering to social distancing measures imposed by the COVID-19 pandemic. To promote the single, a limited 7" vinyl was released on Minogue's website, and she performed it several times, including appearances on "The Tonight Show Starring Jimmy Fallon" and "Good Morning America".

Background and composition
After wrapping up promotion for her fourteenth studio album Golden and subsequent tour, Minogue began work on her new album in 2019. While on tour, she was inspired by a segment was influenced by disco aesthetic and Studio 54, and felt her creative direction was "heading straight back to the dance floor" with a disco-influenced album. Minogue began planning new music with long-time collaborators Ash Howes, Jonathan Green, and Richard Stannard during the early stages of production. Being one of the first tracks recorded for the album, the collaboration in making "Say Something" "dropped from the sky" after experimenting with certain beats and all of them singing into a microphone. The track was recorded Brighton, England. 

Musically, "Say Something" experiments with a variety of genres. It begins with a electronica intro, and progresses into a track influenced by disco, dance-pop, electropop, and synthpop. Instrumentally, the track incorporates "thick" synths, drum crashes, a funk guitar, and a choir. Lyrically, the song addresses themes of seeking love and calling for unity; Minogue commented, "is about all of our eternal quest for love" and searching for "something or someone out there that you can relate to." Minogue sings lines such as "Love is love / It never ends / Can we all be as one again?" and uses whisper vocals on the chorus. Rolling Stones Claire Shaffer commented that the lyrics "feel pertinent for our quarantine days". Similarly, Katie Bain from Billboard wrote that the track sees Minogue "hitting the topical nail on the head", and Joshua Martin from MTV News Australia described the song as a "call for unity".

Release and promotion
On 21 July, media outlets reported that Minogue was preparing to release her fifteenth album Disco in the second half of 2020; alongside unveiling the album's cover, outlets also reported that a new single titled "Say Something" was due for imminent release. Minogue announced the album release and the single release on 21 and 22 July 2020, respectively. "Say Something" was released as the album's lead single on 23 July 2020, by BMG Rights Management and Minogue's company, Darenote. It was formatted as a digital release and limited edition 7" vinyl, that was released on Minogue's website. It premiered on 23 July at 08:30 BST on BBC Radio 2, during The Zoe Ball Breakfast Show, and subsequently uploaded to YouTube on the same day, and a lyric video was released the following day. Furthermore, "Say Something" was also used as Channel 4 F1's outro for 2020 Spanish Grand Prix and Netflix's Never Have I Ever.

Critical reception
"Say Something" received widespread acclaim from most music critics. Joey Nolfi of Entertainment Weekly called it a "mirrorball anthem", and said that the song is "more than an ode to the lust for human connection in dark times, it's a poetic, surprisingly deep step forward" for Minogue. The Guardian's Kate Solomon described "Say Something" as a "quasi-disco bop with a slightly saccharine post-quarantine sentiment" that Minogue "carries perfectly". Similarly, writing for The Independent, Roisin O'Connor described the song as a "disco banger" with "grinding guitar licks and funky beats". In his review for Variety, Jem Aswad viewed that "Say Something" is one of the "best disco songs in recent memory". He wrote that it has an "irresistible chorus" and a "driving rhythm", as well as "perhaps unintentionally relevant lyrics". Mike Wass of Idolator compared the song to those of Scissor Sisters and St. Vincent, and commended its "majestic, serotonin-raising chorus".

"Say Something" received positive feedback as one of the highlights of its parent album, Disco. Writing for AllMusic, Neil Z. Yeung selected the track is a standout. He stated that the song "is not only a peak on Disco, it's also one of Minogue's best songs to date, a rapturous anthem that unifies with its urgent plea of "Love is love/It never ends/Can we all be as one again?." Katherine St. Asaph from Pitchfork Media said it was "is the strongest and also the least disco," while also commending its lyrical content and Minogue's emotional delivery in the track. In a mixed review, Sal Cinquemani from Slant Magazine said that whilst the track as single, was a "deceptive introduction" to the record, he stated "the track [...] works better as a momentary respite among Disco’s otherwise frenetic middle stretch."

Furthermore, "Say Something" was ranked at 95th on Billboard's The 100 Best Songs of 2020 list. The song was shortlisted for Song of the Year by APRA Music Awards in Australia, but did not garner a nomination.

Commercial performance
Commercially, "Say Something" performed moderately. It debuted at number 82 on the UK Singles Chart, marking her first chart appearance since "Stop Me from Falling" in 2018. It ultimately peaked at number 56. Moreover, it peaked at number nine and 11 on the UK Singles Downloads and Sales Chart, respectively. According to the Official Charts in the UK, "Say Something" became her biggest airplay hit in the UK since "Get Outta My Way" (2010). By February 2021, "Say Something" has sold over 75,555 units in the country.

The track performed moderately elsewhere. "Say Something" did not chart on the ARIA Charts in her native Australia, but it did peak at number 5 on the Radiomonitor Airplay Chart and number 5 on the Australian Digital Songs Chart by Billboard. It also spent a sole week on the New Zealand Hot Singles chart at number 40, one of Minogue's lowest charting efforts in the country. In the United States, it debuted at number three on Billboards Dance/Electronic Digital Song Sales. According to Nielsen Music/MRC Data the track generated 429,000 US streams and 3,000 downloads in its first week. 

Music video

The music video for "Say Something" was directed by Sophie Muller. It was filmed at the Black Island Studios in London, England whilst adhering to social distancing measures due to the COVID-19 pandemic. As a result, the video features only Minogue and a dancer, Kaner Flex. The fishnet catsuit and black and white dress featured in the video were designed by Ed Marler; the crystal mesh bodysuit was by Gucci, and latter costume was inspired by an image of Marisa Berenson that Minogue and Muller found during research into Studio 54.

Portraying Minogue as a Space Age Hollywood actress, the "inter-galactic" video was inspired by 1970s psychedelia and The Great Gatsby (1925). It depicts the singer travelling through the universe whilst mounted upon a golden horse sculpture, shooting lasers from her hands and flying on a hovercraft.

Live performances
On 17 September 2020, Minogue performed the song for the first time on The Tonight Show Starring Jimmy Fallon. The performance was filmed remotely and recorded on a 1980s-era BBC News television camera, providing a "vintage VHS tape filter" aesthetic according to Billboard, while Minogue wore a vintage Antony Price dress from 1983. On 19 September 2020, Minogue performed an acoustic version of "Say Something" during the charity live concert I Love Beirut, organized by Lebanese singer Mika, to raise funds for victims of the 2020 Beirut explosion. On 1 November, the performance from the then-upcoming concert special 'Infinite Disco' was aired on The Sound. On 6 November, she performed again on The Zoe Ball Breakfast Show and Good Morning America. On 7 November, she performed the song accompanied by the members of The House Gospel Choir on her live stream concert 'Infinite Disco'.

Track listingDigital download / streaming"Say Something" – 3:32Digital download / streaming – acoustic version"Say Something" (acoustic) – 3:15
"Say Something" – 3:32Digital download / streaming – Syn Cole remix "Say Something" (Syn Cole remix) – 3:007-inch vinyl'
"Say Something" – 3:32
"Say Something" (acoustic) – 3:15

Credits and personnel
Credits adapted from Tidal.

 Kylie Minogue – lead vocals, writer, backing vocals and vocal production
 Louis Lion – programming
 Jon Green – writer, backing vocals, producer, guitar, keyboards
 Duck Blackwell – additional producer, keyboards, mixing engineer
 Dick Beetham – recording engineer
 Richard "Biff" Stannard – writer, backing vocals, producer, keyboards
 Ash Howes – writer, programming
 Adetoun Anibi – backing vocals

Charts

Certifications

Release history

References

2020 singles
2020 songs
BMG Rights Management singles
Dance-pop songs
Disco songs
Electropop songs
Kylie Minogue songs
Music videos directed by Sophie Muller
Music videos shot in London
Songs written by Ash Howes
Songs written by Kylie Minogue
Songs written by Richard Stannard (songwriter)
Synth-pop songs